Jorge Alberto Rojas Méndez (born January 10, 1977, in Mérida) is a Venezuelan former footballer.

Career

Club
After playing for several small clubs in Venezuela, Rojas began to establish himself as one of the nations top players while at Caracas FC. Following his successful first stint at Caracas, which included two league titles, he joined Ecuadorean power Emelec in 2003. That season, he was selected as the top foreign player in the league. Rojas than briefly returned to Caracas before joining Colombian club Atlético Nacional. While at Nacional Rojas helped the club to the 2005 Apertura Championship, and was considered one of the top players in the league. 

Following his successful stint with Nacional, Rojas returned for his third stint with Caracas FC guiding the club to back to back league titles in 2006 and 2007. At the conclusion of the 2007 campaign he returned to Colombia to play for América de Cali, while at Cali he appeared in 22 matches, notching 4 goals (3 from the penalty spot). Following the Colombian league season, Rojas was sold to Unión Atlético Maracaibo. He scored his first goal with Maracaibo in a 1-2 defeat to his former club Caracas FC. While at Maracaibo, Rojas participated in a famous 1-1 draw against Boca Juniors in the 2008 Copa Libertadores. He also led Maracaibo to the final of the Copa de Venezuela where his club would lose the series to Aragua Fútbol Club on away goals.

Rojas signed with New York Red Bulls of Major League Soccer in July 2008. He had two assists in his first game for the club against the Los Angeles Galaxy on July 19, 2008. He appeared in 11 regular season matches for New York, registering 5 assists. Following the Major League Soccer season it appeared that Rojas would go loan to Mineros de Guayana during the MLS off-season, however the move never materialized. In his next season with New York Red Bulls he would score two goals. But this form he produced would only come once. At the end of the season he was cut loose and returned to Venezuela to play for Deportivo Táchira.

He then later also played for Mineros de Guayana, Aragua and Metropolitanos.

On 27 December 2019, 42-year old Rojas announced his retirement from football.

International
Rojas started his career with the Venezuela National Team at the age of 14, when he joined the U-15 squad, coached by Ratomir Djukovic and then by Augusto Viso. Rojas went on to play at the Bolivarian Games and then to the South American Games in Colombia in 1993. Rojas continue through all the Natl Youth Teams until he finally was called up to the Senior Team. Rojas has earned 90 caps for the Venezuela national team, making him the second most capped player in the history of Venezuelan international football as of April 2009.

He made his international debut on January 27, 1999, in a friendly against Denmark. The match ended 1–1 and was played at Estadio José Pachencho Romero in Maracaibo.

International goals

Honors

Club
 Universidad de Los Andes F.C.
Segunda División Venezolana (1) 1994/1995
 Caracas FC
Primera División Venezolana (4)
2000/2001, 2002/2003, 2005/2006, 2006/2007
Copa de Venezuela (1) 2001
 Atlético Nacional
Copa Mustang (1) 2005-I
 Unión Atlético Maracaibo
Copa de Venezuela Runner Up 2008
 New York Red Bulls
MLS Cup Runner Up 2008
 Deportivo Táchira
Primera División Venezolana (1) 2010/2011

Statistics

References

External links

International statistics at rsssf

1977 births
Living people
Association football defenders
Association football midfielders
Venezuelan footballers
Venezuela international footballers
Estudiantes de Mérida players
Caracas FC players
C.S. Emelec footballers
Atlético Nacional footballers
América de Cali footballers
UA Maracaibo players
New York Red Bulls players
Deportivo Táchira F.C. players
A.C.C.D. Mineros de Guayana players
Aragua FC players
Metropolitanos FC players
Boca Juniors footballers
1999 Copa América players
2001 Copa América players
2004 Copa América players
2007 Copa América players
Association football utility players
Venezuelan Primera División players
Categoría Primera A players
Ecuadorian Serie A players
Major League Soccer players
Expatriate footballers in Argentina
Expatriate footballers in Colombia
Expatriate footballers in Ecuador
Expatriate soccer players in the United States
Venezuelan expatriate sportspeople in Argentina
Venezuelan expatriate sportspeople in Colombia
Venezuelan expatriate sportspeople in Ecuador
Venezuelan expatriate sportspeople in the United States
People from Mérida, Mérida